Actual Size is the sixth album by the American rock band Mr. Big, released in August 2001. It was their second and final studio album to feature guitarist Richie Kotzen. Actual Size would be Mr. Big's final studio album for 9 years, until What If... in 2010. The song "Shine" was used as the closing theme to the anime adaptation of Hellsing. Kotzen and Sheehan's band The Winery Dogs performed regularly the song in recent tours.

Track listing

Personnel
Mr. Big
Eric Martin – lead vocals
Richie Kotzen – lead guitar, co-lead vocals on "Suffocation", keyboards on "Nothing Like It in the World", engineer
Billy Sheehan – bass guitar
Pat Torpey – drums

Additional musicians
Richie Zito – guitar, mandolin, producer, engineer

Production
Brian Reeves, Patrick Shevelin –  assistant engineers
Phil Kaffel –  mixing
Larry Freemantle – art direction

Charts

Certifications

References

External links
Heavy Harmonies page

2001 albums
Mr. Big (American band) albums
Albums produced by Richie Zito
Atlantic Records albums